The 2013–14 Korisliiga season was the 74th season of the Finnish national championship named Korisliiga, the highest professional basketball league in Finland. The defending champion was Bisons Loimaa. Kyle Fogg was both scoring champion and league MVP, while Antero Lehto was named Player of the Year. Tampereen Pyrintö took the title, its third in history.

Regular season

|}

Playoffs

Awards
Most Valuable Player:
Domestic Player:  Antero Lehto
Foreign Player:  Kyle Fogg 
Finals MVP:  Damon Williams
Defensive Player:  Tuukka Kotti 
 Rookie of the Year:  Anton Odabasi
 Most Improved Player:  Antero Lehto
 Sixth Man of the Year:  Ville Mäkäläinen
 Coach of the Year:  Pieti Poikola
 Referee of the Year:  Petri Mäntylä
Sources:

Notes

References

Korisliiga seasons
Finnish
Koris